was a Japanese poet and statesman. He was born the son of Emperor Saga and a member of the Saga Genji clan. He is sometimes mentioned as the model for Hikaru Genji in important Japanese literary classic The Tale of Genji.

Under his title Kawara no Sadaijin (河原左大臣, Minister of the Left of Kawara), he is the author of poem 14 in the Ogura Hyakunin Isshu poetry anthology:

The poem originally appeared in the Kokinshū, no. 724. Here is another translation:
 The dye with hare's-foot-fern, of Michinoku—who else would have made me feel as disturbed?

The poet is also famous for making a replica of the uta-makura Shiogama ("poetic place name") in his garden.

His tomb resides at the Seiryō-ji, a Buddhist temple situated on what was once Saga Moor in Kyoto.

We also see one of his poems included in the Gosen Wakashū.

References

822 births
895 deaths
Minamoto clan
Hyakunin Isshu poets
Sons of emperors